This page details Argentina's participation at the UCI Track Cycling World Championships, the highest level of competition with professional track cycling. Winners of the World Championships are entitled to wear the rainbow jersey within their respective discipline for the following period of one year. Past World Champions are typically signified by with rainbow edging or piping on their jersey and shorts.

Results

Men

Sources

References

Nations at the UCI Track Cycling World Championships
Argentina at cycling events